Dave Marit is a Canadian politician, who was elected to the Legislative Assembly of Saskatchewan in the 2016 provincial election. He represents the electoral district of Wood River as a member of the Saskatchewan Party.

Cabinet positions

References

Living people
Members of the Executive Council of Saskatchewan
Saskatchewan Party MLAs
21st-century Canadian politicians
Year of birth missing (living people)